John Martin Pritchard (born 30 November 1957) is a British rower who competed in the 1980 Summer Olympics, winning a silver medal, and in the 1984 Summer Olympics.

Pritchard was born in Fulham, South West London. His father, John William Pritchard, was a Detective Chief Superintendent and who made his career as an investigating officer on the Great Train Robbery in 1963.

He attended Halford Road Primary school, Fulham, St Clement Danes Grammar School, Ducane Road, Hammersmith from 1969–1975 and Robinson College, Cambridge from 1983 to 1986, where he read law. Whilst at Cambridge, he was President of the Hawks' Club, succeeding Rob Andrew, the England Rugby player.

In 1980 he was a crew member of the British eight which won the Olympic silver medal. In 1981, he won a silver medal at the World Rowing Championships in Munich. He finished fifth with the British eight in the 1984 Olympics.

He coached the Oxford University Boat Club in 1980 and 1981, and the Cambridge University Boat Club in 1982 and 1983. He rowed in The Boat Race three times for Cambridge against Oxford. In the 1984 race, the crew in which he rowed famously hit a barge moored above Putney Bridge resulting in the much-broadcast image of a sinking boat. The win in the 1986 race was the only Cambridge win in a run of 17 wins for Oxford. By winning in 1986, Cambridge denied Oxford winning the Ladbrokes trophy outright, having won for the previous nine years.

Pritchard founded and runs an executive search business, Piper Pritchard Associates, in London. He was a director of the British Olympic Association and is Chairman of Right To Play, an international charity which supports children in war-torn and deprived parts of the world through sport. He is Chairman of the Hawks' Club. He is also chairman of the steering committee and deputy chairman of the alumni advisory board of Cambridge University.

In 2014, he rowed the length of the Mississippi river in a traditional Thames racing skiff. The 2,320 mile journey took three months and raised over $1,000,000 for Right to Play.

References

1957 births
Living people
British male rowers
Cambridge University Boat Club rowers
Olympic rowers of Great Britain
Rowers at the 1980 Summer Olympics
Rowers at the 1984 Summer Olympics
Olympic silver medallists for Great Britain
Alumni of Robinson College, Cambridge
Olympic medalists in rowing
Medalists at the 1980 Summer Olympics
World Rowing Championships medalists for Great Britain